Devin Rask is a Canadian ice hockey coach and former center who was an All-American for Providence.

Career
Rask was a star played in juniors, twice averaging more than point per season. After hitting the century mark in 1999, Rask began attending Providence College in the fall. While his offensive production saw a marked decline as a freshman, his scoring touch returned and he was named an All-American as a sophomore. That season he helped the Friars win 22 games, their highest total in a decade, and reach the Hockey East finals. He was named team captain for his junior season but both he and Providence declined. After a losing season, Rask returned as a senior and helped the team recover with a 4th-place finish.

After graduating, Rask played in the Toronto Maple Leafs farm system for a year before heading to Germany. He played two more years in the Oberliga (Germany's third-tier league) before retiring and beginning his coaching career. Rask's first job was as an assistant coach for Wesleyan, a position he held for 2 years. After that he came out of retirement and played a few games for Danbury Mad Hatters in their only year of existence. He was back behind the bench the following year, this time as an assistant for Connecticut. Two years later he was on the move again, this time being named ice hockey director and head coach for the South Kent School. He was with the program for over eight years before leaving to take over a similar position at Mount Saint Charles Academy.

Statistics

Regular season and playoffs

Awards and honors

References

External links

1978 births
Living people
AHCA Division I men's ice hockey All-Americans
Canadian ice hockey centres
Ice hockey people from Saskatchewan
Providence Friars men's ice hockey players
Trenton Titans players
St. John's Maple Leafs players
Hannover Indians players
Danbury Mad Hatters players